Jeffrey Bryan Davis (born October 6, 1973) is an American actor, impressionist and comedian. He is known for his work as a recurring performer on the improv comedy show Whose Line Is It Anyway? From July 2016 until October 2019, he has starred as the Goblin Hero Boneweevil on the VRV Direct original production HarmonQuest.

He appeared in Drew Carey's Green Screen Show as one of the main actors. In 2011, Davis appeared on Drew Carey's improv show, Improv-A-Ganza. He is also known for his impersonations of several actors, notably Sam Elliott, Christopher Walken, Keanu Reeves, and Jeff Goldblum. He also had a lead role in 2006's award-winning independent film The Boys & Girls Guide to Getting Down as Marty the housesitter.

Early life and education
Davis was born in Los Angeles and raised in Whittier, California. He began his acting career at the age of four at the Groundlings Theater in Hollywood, playing Linus in You're a Good Man, Charlie Brown. He attended La Serna High School.

Davis started in commercials, and at age 11 he was cast as Louis in the Broadway production of The King and I with Yul Brynner. A national U.S. tour followed, and, after 750 performances, Davis returned home to attend school.

Career
Davis's screen acting debut was a  role in the series Highway To Heaven as a 12-year-old college student prodigy. He began performing with various improv troupes. He worked with the short-video website Channel 101 and was in the Dan Harmon series Laser Fart. In addition, he played David Lee Roth of Van Halen in an episode of Yacht Rock.

Soon after, Davis landed a recurring role on the improv series Whose Line Is It Anyway?. His comedic timing won over comedian Steve Martin and the other producers of The Downer Channel, earning Davis a spot in the cast of the comedy series in 2001. He has appeared in the television series The Norm Show, The Drew Carey Show, and The Jamie Kennedy Experiment.

He appeared in the telefilm Tuesdays with Morrie and was a series regular in Happy Family, opposite Christine Baranski and John Larroquette. He played an attorney in the October 9, 2008 episode of The Sarah Silverman Program. Davis regularly appears as a guest on the Superego podcast, where he frequently impersonates Sam Elliott.

Davis has toured on "The Improv All Stars" alongside fellow Whose Line stars Drew Carey, Ryan Stiles, Colin Mochrie, Chip Esten, Brad Sherwood, Kathy Greenwood, and Greg Proops. Davis has been part of two USO tours, and he tours with Stiles, Esten, and Proops doing live shows across the U.S. and Canada. He was often used in games that required improvisational singing and usually partnered with Wayne Brady on Whose Line and Esten on Drew Carey's Green Screen Show or live tours.

Davis was one of the rotating announcers on television's longest-running game show, The Price Is Right, after Rich Fields' departure, until George Gray was chosen as the next permanent announcer. In 2014, Game Show Network announced he would host a game show called The Line.

Starting in 2012 Davis co-hosted the live improvisational comedy podcast Harmontown with Community creator Dan Harmon where he played "Comptroller" to Harmon's "Mayor" role, serving as the show's anchor, announcer, and sidekick until the show ended its run in late 2019.  In 2021, Davis, along with Spencer Crittenden and Kevin Day, started the podcast That Happens, wherein conversation is followed by role-playing. 

He is often confused with Jeff Davis, the creator of the television series Teen Wolf. In 2020, he appeared on the Teen Wolf episode of Diminishing Returns podcast and gave an interview, posing as the other Jeff Davis.

Filmography

Film

Television

Podcast

References

External links

1973 births
Living people
Male actors from Los Angeles County, California
Singers from Los Angeles
American male comedians
American male television actors
People from Whittier, California
Comedians from California
20th-century American comedians
21st-century American comedians
21st-century American singers
21st-century American male singers